Samuel Hill (May 2, 1926 – April 4, 1977) was an American Negro league outfielder in the 1940s.

A native of New Castle, Alabama, Hill made his Negro leagues debut in 1946 with the Chicago American Giants. He played three seasons with Chicago, and was selected to the 1948 East–West All-Star Game. Hill went on to play minor league ball in the Mandak League from 1950 to 1952, and later played for the Williamsport Grays, Charlotte Hornets, and Duluth-Superior White Sox. He died in 1977 at age 48.

References

External links
 and Seamheads

1926 births
1977 deaths
Place of death missing
Bismarck Barons players
Carman Cardinals players
Charlotte Hornets (baseball) players
Chicago American Giants players
Duluth-Superior White Sox players
Williamsport Grays players
Winnipeg Buffaloes players
Baseball outfielders
20th-century African-American sportspeople